The enzyme indolepyruvate decarboxylase catalyzes the chemical reaction

3-(indol-3-yl)pyruvate  2-(indol-3-yl)acetaldehyde + CO2

This enzyme belongs to the family of lyases, specifically the carboxy-lyases, which cleave carbon-carbon bonds.  The systematic name of this enzyme class is 3-(indol-3-yl)pyruvate carboxy-lyase [(2-indol-3-yl)acetaldehyde-forming]. Other names in common use include indol-3-yl-pyruvate carboxy-lyase, and 3-(indol-3-yl)pyruvate carboxy-lyase.  This enzyme participates in tryptophan metabolism.

Structural studies

As of late 2007, only one structure has been solved for this class of enzymes, with the PDB accession code .

References 

 

EC 4.1.1
Enzymes of known structure